Chimbarongo, Chile, is a city and commune located  south of Santiago in the Colchagua Province of the O'Higgins Region. Many of the people of Chimbarongo make their living weaving wickerwork, mimbre, baskets.

Demographics
Of these, 16,889 (52.3%) lived in urban areas and 15,427 (47.7%) in rural areas. The population grew by 5.4% (1,651 persons) between the 1992 and 2002 censuses.

Administration
As a commune, Chimbarongo is a third-level administrative division of Chile administered by a municipal council, headed by an alcalde who is directly elected every four years. The 2021-2024 alcalde is  Marco Contreras Jorquera.

References

External links
  Municipality of Chimbarongo

Communes of Chile
Populated places established in 1871
Populated places in Colchagua Province
1871 establishments in Chile